Ezekiel Bartholomew Rowe (born 30 October 1973 in Stoke Newington, London, England), is an English footballer who played as a forward in the Football League.

References

External links

1973 births
Living people
English footballers
Footballers from Stoke Newington
Association football forwards
Chelsea F.C. players
Barnet F.C. players
Bangor City F.C. players
Brighton & Hove Albion F.C. players
Peterborough United F.C. players
Kettering Town F.C. players
Doncaster Rovers F.C. players
Welling United F.C. players
King's Lynn F.C. players
Hinckley United F.C. players
English Football League players